WKQY is a Contemporary Christian and Religious-formatted broadcast radio station licensed to Tazewell, Virginia, serving Tazewell and Richlands in Virginia and Welch in West Virginia. WKQY is owned and operated by CSN International.

History

WKQY was purchased by Calvary Chapel of Twin Falls, Inc. in 2013 and became an affiliate of CSN International on May 1, 2013.

The station was previously owned by Triad Broadcasting Company, LLC.  Prior to its current format, the station aired a Classic rock format as "Eagle 100.1 & 100.9 FM", simulcasting sister station WKOY-FM.

References

External links
 CSN International Online
 

1968 establishments in Virginia
Contemporary Christian radio stations in the United States
Radio stations established in 1968
KQY
Tazewell County, Virginia